Matthew Young (17 November 1944 – 1 March 2015) was a British civil servant. Young worked for the governments of Harold Wilson, James Callaghan and Margaret Thatcher; he later went on to be chief executive of the Panini company.

References 

1944 births
2015 deaths
British civil servants
British chief executives
People from the London Borough of Richmond upon Thames